Gorenja Žaga is a small settlement on the left bank of the Kolpa River north of Kostel in southern Slovenia. The area is part of the traditional region of Lower Carniola and is now included in the Southeast Slovenia Statistical Region.

References

External links
Gorenja Žaga on Geopedia

Populated places in the Municipality of Kostel